Lake Placid Equestrian Stadium is an equestrian stadium in Lake Placid, New York, United States. The opening ceremonies to the 1980 Winter Olympics were organized in a temporary stadium built next to it, which held 30,000 spectators.

References

1980 Winter Olympics official report. Volume 1. pp. 78–81.

Olympic stadiums
Venues of the 1980 Winter Olympics
Sports venues in Essex County, New York
1939 establishments in New York (state)
Sports venues completed in 1939
American football venues in New York (state)
Equestrian venues in the United States